Gustav Oehrli (born 2 May 1962) is a Swiss former alpine skier.

References

1962 births
Living people
Swiss male alpine skiers
Place of birth missing (living people)
20th-century Swiss people